Eon Hooper (born 9 July 1991) is a Guyanese cricketer. He made his first-class debut for Guyana in the 2016–17 Regional Four Day Competition on 11 November 2016.

References

External links
 

1991 births
Living people
Guyanese cricketers
Guyana cricketers
Place of birth missing (living people)